True Love is the eighth studio album, and ninth album overall, by American singer Pat Benatar, released in 1991. The album is a combination of covers and original tracks of jump blues, which Benatar recorded with husband Neil Giraldo, Myron Grombacher and the Roomful of Blues horn section and drummer. The CD edition of the album included the seasonal standard "Please Come Home for Christmas" as a bonus track, which was released to the US Troops serving in the Gulf War, and was not included on foreign vinyl and cassette pressings of the album.

True Love reached No. 37 on the U.S. Billboard album chart.

Benatar was the May artist of the month for VH-1 in 1991 in support of the album.

Track listing

Personnel

Musicians
Pat Benatar – vocals
Neil Giraldo – guitars
Charlie Giordano – piano, organ, accordion
Chuck Domanico – bass
Myron Grombacher – drums on tracks 1 and 10
Lenny Castro – percussion

Roomful of Blues
Greg Piccolo – tenor saxophone
Doug James – baritone saxophone
Rick Lataille – alto saxophone
Carl Querfurth – trombone
Bob Enos – trumpet
John Rossi – drums

Production
Neil Giraldo – producer
Gordon Fordyce – engineer, mixing of tracks 4, 8, 11
Frank Linx – assistant engineer. mixing of tracks 4, 8, 11
Ed Thacker – mixing
Stephen Marcussen – mastering at Precision Lacquer

Charts

Weekly charts

Year-end charts

Certifications

References

External links
"True Love" at discogs

1991 albums
Pat Benatar albums
Chrysalis Records albums
Jump blues albums
Blues albums by American artists